McKinley, MacKinley or Mackinlay is a Scottish and Irish surname historically associated with northwestern Ireland's County Donegal, the over-kingdom of Ulaid in northeastern Ireland and the Scottish Highlands.

One derivation given is that the McKinley are of the ancient Ulaid race and are a branch of its "Red Branch" MacDunleavy (dynasty) royal house of the Dal Fiatach which dominated the kingship of the over-kingdom of Ulaid (original Gaelic language Mac Duinnshléibhe). Etymology for the origins of the surname proposes that the Anglicized surname McKinley, like the surname MacNulty (Gaelic Mac an Ultaigh, trans. "son of the ultonian, ulidian or ulsterman"), arose originally from a Gaelic nickname given the deposed MacDunleavy dynasty royals while exiled in Tirconnell and elsewhere. Being, also, one of Ireland's ancient hereditary medical families, the MacDunleavy (variant English spelling MacDonlevy) were in Tirconnell accorded the high Gaelic status of "ollahm leighis" or the official physicians to the O'Donnell clan in County Donegal and practiced as physicians while exiled in Argyll, Scotland. The nickname was Mac an Leigh. Per this scenario the Gaelic language patronymic forming prefix "Mac" (meaning "descended of") is joined to the Gaelic language "Léigh" meaning leech, but denoting a physician. Leeching having been for millennia, in Gaelic Ireland and elsewhere, a commonly employed medical practice.

Otherwise, the name is said to be of Scottish origin, meaning 'son of Finlay'.

Notable people with the surname "McKinley" include

A
Ada S. McKinley (1868–1952), American educator
Alvin McKinley (born 1978), American football player
Andrew McKinley (1903–1996), American musician
Ashley Chadbourne McKinley (1896–1970), American photographer

B
Ben McKinley (born 1987), Australian rules footballer
Bill McKinley (1910–1980), American baseball umpire
Bill McKinley (footballer) (1882–1952), Australian rules footballer
Brunson McKinley (born 1943), American diplomat

C
Carl McKinley (1895–1966), American composer
Cedric McKinley (born 1987), American football player
Charles McKinley (1902–1983), English footballer
Charlie McKinley (1903–1990), Australian rules footballer
Chuck McKinley (1941–1986), American tennis player
Craig McKinley (disambiguation), multiple people

D
David McKinley (born 1947), American politician
Dennis McKinley (born 1976), American football player
Dominic McKinley (born 1960), Irish sportsperson

E
Elizabeth McKinley, New Zealand academic
Elliott Miles McKinley (born 1969), American composer

G
Galen McKinley, American professor
Gareth H. McKinley, American professor
George E. McKinley (1872–1941), American politician

I
Ian McKinley (born 1989), Irish-Italian rugby union footballer
Ida Saxton McKinley (1847–1907), American social figure
Ivan McKinley (born 1969), South African soccer player

J
James McKinley (disambiguation), multiple people
Javon McKinley (born 1998), American football player
J. C. McKinley (1891–1950), American neurologist
J. Edward McKinley (1917–2004), American actor
Jennifer McKinley, Northern Irish scientist
Jesse McKinley (born 1970), American journalist
Joanne McKinley (born 1988), Irish cricketer
John McKinley (1780–1852), American politician
John C. McKinley (1859–1927), American politician and lawyer
Joseph H. McKinley Jr. (born 1954), American judge
Joss McKinley (born 1981), British photographer
J. W. McKinley (1891–1957), American politician

K
Kathryn S. McKinley (born 1962), American computer scientist
Kelly McKinley, Canadian-American museum curator
Kenny McKinley (1987–2010), American football player
Kent S. McKinley (1898–1972), American politician

L
Larry McKinley (1927–2013), American music promoter
L. C. McKinley (1918–1970), American guitarist
Lee McKinley (1906–1986), American politician

M
Mairead McKinley (born 1970), Northern Irish actress
Michael McKinley (born 1954), American diplomat

P
Paul McKinley (born 1947), American politician
Peter McKinley (1811–??), American politician

R
Ray McKinley (1910–1995), American musician
Richard McKinley (1886–1951), American politician
Robert McKinley (disambiguation), multiple people
Robin McKinley (born 1952), American author
Rodney J. McKinley (born 1956), American air force officer
Ruth Gowdy McKinley (1931–1981), American-Canadian artist

T
Takkarist McKinley (born 1995), American football player
Tamara McKinley (born 1948), British-Australian author
Therese McKinley (1928–2021), American baseball player
Thomas McKinley (1888–1949), Australian politician

V
Vern McKinley, American political advisor
Verone McKinley III (born 2000), American football player
Virgil McKinley (1874–1954), American football coach

W
Wes McKinley (born 1945), American politician
William McKinley (disambiguation), multiple people

Notable people with the given name "McKinley" include

McKinley Bailey (born 1980), American politician
McKinley Belcher III (born 1984), American actor
McKinley Blackburn, American economist
McKinley Boston (born 1945), American academic administrator
McKinley Boykin (born 1983), American football player
McKinley Brewer (1896–1955), American baseball player
McKinley Burnett (1897–1968), American lawyer
McKinley Dixon (born 1995), American musician
McKinley Freeman (born 1973), American actor
McKinley Hunt (born 1997), Canadian rugby union footballer
McKinley Mitchell (1934–1986), American singer
McKinley Morganfield, known as Muddy Waters (1913–1983), American musician
McKinley L. Price (born 1949), American politician
McKinley Singleton (born 1961), American basketball player
McKinley Tennyson (born 1979), American soccer player
McKinley Thompson Jr. (1922–2006), American automotive designer
McKinley Washington Jr. (1936–2022), American politician
McKinley Wright IV (born 1997), American basketball player

Fictional characters
Dash McKinley, a character on the Australian television series Blue Heelers

See also
MacKinley, a disambiguation page for "MacKinley"
Senator McKinley (disambiguation), a disambiguation page for Senators surnamed "McKinley"

References

Surnames
Anglicised Scottish Gaelic-language surnames
Anglicised Irish-language surnames